The 1931 Australian Grand Prix was a motor race held at the Phillip Island Circuit in Victoria, Australia on 23 March 1931. The race, which was the fourth Australian Grand Prix and the fourth to be held at Phillip Island, had 19 entries and 14 starters. It was organised by the Victorian Light Car Club.

The race was staged using a handicap format with the first car starting 35 minutes before the two "Scratch" cars. Prize money was paid for both handicap and overall results with the principle prize of £100 awarded to the fastest car to complete the distance.

Carl Junker was awarded the Grand Prix win, having set the fastest time driving a Bugatti Type 39. The Handicap Section was won by Cyril Dickason, driving an Austin 7.

Classes
Car competed in four classes:
 A – 850cc
 B – 1100cc
 C – 1500cc
 D – 2000cc

Classification

Notes 
 Weather: Fine & mild
 Race time limit: 4¼ hours from the commencement of the race, i.e., from the first car to start
 Fastest lap: Hope Bartlett – 4'45.00 (79.90 mph)
 Average speed of winning car: 69.87 mph

References

External links
 Australian Grand Prix, The Argus, Tuesday, 24 March 1931, page 8, trove.nla.gov.au
 Joan Richmond collection, collectionsearch.nma.gov.au, as archived at web.archive.org

Grand Prix
Australian Grand Prix
Motorsport at Phillip Island
Australian Grand Prix